International Wrestling Enterprise (国際プロレス興行;, Kokusai Puroresu Kogyō) was a professional wrestling promotion in Japan from 1966 to 1981. Founded by Isao Yoshihara, it was affiliated with the American Wrestling Association in the United States and also had tie-ins with promotions in Canada and Europe. In 1972, it became the first Japanese promotion to bring European wrestler André the Giant to the country. The promotion cooperated with All Japan Pro Wrestling and later, New Japan Pro-Wrestling; the three promotions later came together for an interpromotional event, organized by Tokyo Sports, held at Budokan Hall on August 26, 1979.

When IWE closed its doors in 1981, Inoue, Hara, Tsurumi, and Fuyuki joined All Japan Pro Wrestling, while Kimura, Hamaguchi and Teranishi joined New Japan Pro-Wrestling as a stable that formed the first "invasion" angle in history, later copied by the Japanese UWF, Japan Pro-Wrestling, and the nWo in WCW in America. The promotion is also credited for making Rusher Kimura a major star in Japanese Puroresu and holding Japan's first steel cage match. Isao Yoshihara eventually became a booker in New Japan, until his death in 1985.

Roster

Japanese talent: Toyonobori, Strong Kobayashi, Rusher Kimura, Hiro Matsuda, Thunder Sugiyama, Great Kusatsu, Mighty Inoue, Animal Hamaguchi, Ashura Hara, Isamu Teranishi, Goro Tsurumi, Hiromichi Fuyuki, Ryuma Go, K.Y. Wakamatsu, Mach Hayato, Kintaro Ohki, Kim Duk, Mr. Hito, Umanosuke Ueda, Masa Saito, Mr. Seki
Foreign talent: Bill Robinson, Verne Gagne, André the Giant, George Gordienko, Lou Thesz, Karl Gotch, Danny Hodge, Don Leo Jonathan, Bill Miller, Dick the Bruiser, Crusher Lisowski, Mad Dog Vachon, Nick Bockwinkel, Ray Stevens, Baron Von Raschke, Horst Hoffman, Édouard Carpentier, Peter Maivia, John da Silva, Ivan Koloff, Tarzan Tyler, Larry Hennig, Bobby Heenan, Blackjack Lanza, Blackjack Mulligan, Superstar Billy Graham, Wahoo McDaniel, Red Bastien, The Minnesota Wrecking Crew, Bill Watts, Dusty Rhodes, Dick Murdoch, Buddy Wolfe, Ox Baker, Wild Angus, Killer Tor Kamata, Gypsy Joe, Alexis Smirnoff, The Mongolian Stomper, The Cuban Assassin, Killer Brooks, Jos LeDuc, Sailor White, Big John Quinn, Kurt Von Hess, Professor Tanaka, Dean Ho, The Wild Samoans, Gil Hayes, Pierre Martin, Michel Martel, Ricky Martel, Jake Roberts, Big Daddy Ritter, David Schultz, Dynamite Kid, Mike George, Bob Sweetan, Johnny Powers, Killer Karl Krupp, Ron Bass, Randy Rose, Norvell Austin, The Invader, Luke Graham, Ray Candy, Paul Ellering, Steve Olsonoski, Percy Pringle III, Ric Flair, The Sheepherders.

Championships recognized by IWE

IWE's governing body was called the International Wrestling Alliance and administered the following titles:
IWA World Heavyweight Championship
IWA World Mid-Heavyweight Championship
IWA World Tag Team Championship

Near the end of IWE's existence, it billed a World Wrestling Union title, supposedly based in Germany, to give a push to wrestler Ashura Hara:
WWU World Junior Heavyweight Championship

Before the IWA system was created, IWE recognized the Trans-World Wrestling Alliance titles:
TWWA World Heavyweight Championship
TWWA World Tag Team Championship

See also American Wrestling Association for the AWA World titles.

International Wrestling Promotion (revival)
In 1994, Goro Tsurumi formed a promotion called IWA Kakutō Shijuku (IWA格闘志塾, International Wrestling Alliance Fighting Hope Training School), but in 1997 he renamed the promotion International Wrestling Promotion (国際プロレス・プロモーション Kokusai puroresu promotion). The only recognizable name in the promotion is Tsurumi himself; the rest of the roster uses masked identities. Wrestlers from other independents have been invited to participate, including Shoji Nakamaki and Yukihide Ueno.

Championships recognized by IWP
IWA World Heavyweight Championship — Goro Tsurumi
IWA World Mid-Heavyweight Championship — J.R.F. Lion
IWA World Middleweight Championship — Phantom Funagoshi
IWA World Tag Team Championship (International Pro Wrestling) — Super Iron Hercules and Iron Hercules I
IWA World Junior Heavyweight Tag Team Championship — Tomoya and Macho Bump

See also

Professional wrestling in Japan
List of professional wrestling promotions in Japan

References

External links
International Wrestling Enterprise at Puroresu.com
International Wrestling Enterprise at Wrestlingdata.com

Japanese professional wrestling promotions
1966 establishments in Japan
1981 disestablishments in Japan